Magne Thomassen (born 1 May 1941) is a former speed skater from Norway. He participated in international championships over a period of more than ten years. He took part in 23 country matches for Norway in the period 1959–1971 and competed in the European Speed Skating Championships, World Allround Speed Skating Championships and World Sprint Speed Skating Championships between 1962 and 1972.

Biography
After setting a world record on the 1,500 meters with the time 2:02.5 on 5 February 1972, Magne Thomassen conquered the first position on the Adelskalenderen ranking for a period of two days until Kees Verkerk regained that position.

Thomassen became Norwegian allround champion in 1968. He became the first winner of the Norwegian sprint speed skating championship in 1970, a title he also won the year thereafter.

Thomassen won silver in the 500 m event of the 1968 Winter Olympic Games, silver in the World Allround Speed Skating Championships in 1968 and 1970, bronze in the 1970 World Sprint Speed Skating Championships as well as bronze in the 1968 allround European Speed Skating Championships.

He represented the club Trondhjems Skøiteklub.

Records

World record

Source: SpeedSkatingStats.com

Personal records 
To put these personal records in perspective, the WR column lists the official world records on the dates that Thomassen skated his personal records.

Note that Thomassen's score on the Big combination was no world record because Kees Verkerk skated an even lower total of points on that day.

References
Notes

Bibliography

 Eng, Trond. All Time International Championships, Complete Results: 1889 – 2002. Askim, Norway: WSSSA-Skøytenytt, 2002.
 Eng, Trond; Gjerde, Arild and Teigen, Magne. Norsk Skøytestatistikk Gjennom Tidene, Menn/Kvinner, 1999 (6. utgave). Askim/Skedsmokorset/Veggli, Norway: WSSSA-Skøytenytt, 1999.
 Eng, Trond; Gjerde, Arild; Teigen, Magne and Teigen, Thorleiv. Norsk Skøytestatistikk Gjennom Tidene, Menn/Kvinner, 2004 (7. utgave). Askim/Skedsmokorset/Veggli/Hokksund, Norway: WSSSA-Skøytenytt, 2004.
 Eng, Trond and Petersen, Preben Gorud. Norges Landskamper, Komplette resultater 1929 – 86. Veggli, Norway: WSSSA-Skøytenytt, 1986.
 Eng, Trond and Teigen, Magne. Komplette Resultater fra offisielle Norske Mesterskap på skøyter, 1894 – 2005. Askim/Veggli, Norway: WSSSA-Skøytenytt, 2005.
 Teigen, Magne. Komplette Resultater Norske Mesterskap På Skøyter, 1887 – 1989: Menn/Kvinner, Senior/Junior. Veggli, Norway: WSSSA-Skøytenytt, 1989.
 Teigen, Magne. Komplette Resultater Internasjonale Mesterskap 1889 – 1989: Menn/Kvinner, Senior/Junior, allround/sprint. Veggli, Norway: WSSSA-Skøytenytt, 1989.

External links
 
 Magne Thomassen at SpeedSkatingStats.com
 
 

1941 births
Living people
World record setters in speed skating
Norwegian male speed skaters
Olympic speed skaters of Norway
Olympic silver medalists for Norway
Speed skaters at the 1968 Winter Olympics
Speed skaters at the 1964 Winter Olympics
Olympic medalists in speed skating
Medalists at the 1968 Winter Olympics
World Allround Speed Skating Championships medalists
World Sprint Speed Skating Championships medalists
People from Melhus
Sportspeople from Trøndelag